"She's a Genius" is a song by Australian rock band Jet. It was released as the lead single from the band's third album Shaka Rock. The song was played at a secret show in Melbourne in November 2008 and was announced as the first single along with the album title and album artwork in April 2009.

It was also played live as part of their set at the Melbourne and Sydney Sound Relief concerts for the victims of the Black Saturday bushfires in March 2009.

Subsequently, it was made available as a free playable track in the iPhone OS game Tap Tap Revenge 2 and on 25 August, as a downloadable song for Rock Band.

The song made an appearance on the TV show NCIS in the episode Reunion. 
The song was also played on the Australian countdown TV show 20 to 1. The chorus was used in RTÉ's National Lottery advertisements.

The single has been certified Gold in Australia for more than 35,000 shipments.

Track listing

Charts

Weekly charts

Year-end charts

Certifications

References

2009 singles
Jet (band) songs
2009 songs
Warner Music Australasia singles
Atlantic Records singles
Songs written by Chris Cester